Gina Smith is an American entrepreneur, author, and journalist who co-wrote Steve Wozniak's 2006 autobiography iWoz: From Computer Geek to Cult Icon: How I Invented the Personal Computer, Co-Founded Apple, and Had Fun Doing It. In 2001, Smith was named one of the 100 most influential people in technology by Upside Magazine.

Technology journalism
From 1990 to 2000, Smith wrote the "Inside Silicon Valley" technology column in the San Francisco Sunday Chronicle. During that time, she was a investigative news reporter for PC Week, senior editor at PC/Computing magazine, and later, as of 1994, she was the editor-in-chief of IDG's Electronic Entertainment magazine. From 1993 to 1997, she hosted On Computers with Gina Smith and Leo Laporte and from 1997 to 2000 she hosted ABC Radio's "Connected with Gina Smith," a radio call-in show that ran in syndication.

In 1995, she co-hosted, with John Levine, an educational PBS special The Internet Show: Drivers' Education for the Internet Superhighway.

Also in 1995 ABC News hired Smith as a technology correspondent., where she covered technology news for ABC News' Nightline with Ted Koppel, ABC World News Tonight with Peter Jennings and Good Morning America.

Smith hosted the ESPN weekly series, "Nothing But Net," with Pat O'Brien in 1995 and 1996. She also hosted a daily tech news show on the Discovery Channel in 1996 and 1997 called Cyberlife. Cyberlife was nominated for a CableACE award in the Business/Consumer Programming Special or Series category in 1997.

In 1999 Smith joined CNET as anchor of the News.Com daily news show on CNBC.

In 2010, Smith returned to journalism as editor-in-chief of the online relaunch of Byte magazine as Byte.com.

Since 2011, she has been CEO of aNewDomain Media, which runs several news websites.

Business ventures
In 2000, Smith was named CEO of the New Internet Computer Company, which she co-founded with Larry Ellison. The firm closed in 2003.

In 2004 David Warthen appointed Smith president of Eye Games, a San Francisco-based video game technology company.

Bibliography

References

External links
 
 aNewDomain – The technology news site Smith founded
 

People from Daytona Beach, Florida
Florida State University alumni
Living people
American biographers
American technology journalists
American people of Serbian descent
Year of birth missing (living people)